Mary Patricia ("Patsy") Willard (born May 18, 1941) is a former American diver. She competed at the 1964 Summer Olympics in Tokyo, where she won a bronze medal in the 3 meter springboard event.

At the 1960 Summer Olympics in Rome, she finished in fourth place in the springboard.

Willard is a 1959 graduate of Mesa High School in Mesa, Arizona and attended Arizona State University.

References

External links
 

1941 births
Living people
Divers at the 1960 Summer Olympics
Divers at the 1964 Summer Olympics
Olympic bronze medalists for the United States in diving
Sportspeople from Phoenix, Arizona
American female divers
Medalists at the 1964 Summer Olympics
Pan American Games bronze medalists for the United States
Pan American Games medalists in diving
Divers at the 1963 Pan American Games
Medalists at the 1963 Pan American Games
Mesa High School alumni
21st-century American women